Dawson Kevin Cram (born September 12, 2001) is an American professional stock car racing driver. He competes part-time in the NASCAR Xfinity Series, driving the No. 74 Chevrolet Camaro for CHK Racing. He has also competed in the NASCAR Craftsman Truck Series and the ARCA Menards Series in the past.

Racing career

Early career
In 2007, at the age of five, Cram started racing in Mini Dwarf race cars in his hometown at the time, San Diego, California. He later moved to Mooresville, North Carolina and started to race in the INEX Bandolero Series. After winning 13 times in Bandoleros, he made the move to legend cars in 2014. His racing slate in 2017 included various starts in legends cars, Super Trucks and late models in the Whelen All-American Series and an attempt at a NASCAR Camping World Truck Series event.

NASCAR
On October 24, 2017, Cram was announced to be driving for Cram Racing Enterprises in the No. 11 truck at Martinsville Speedway in 2017 Texas Roadhouse 200. A blown engine during practice ended the team's weekend, forcing the No. 11 team and Cram to withdraw.

He returned to Martinsville in the spring of 2018, driving for Beaver Motorsports. In his first race with live pit stops, Cram accidentally hit a crew member on his first pit stop and climbed to a 17th-place finish on the lead lap. Cram's third attempt was also at Martinsville; this time it was a joint effort between his family Cram Racing Enterprises and Copp Motorsports. He finished 24th and also ran the next race on the schedule at ISM Raceway in the No. 83.

In 2020, Cram served as a mechanic for the No. 6 NASCAR Xfinity Series team of JD Motorsports. He also ran Truck races for Long Motorsports and Reaume Brothers Racing. Cram left Long Motorsports in August for financial reasons, but later purchased the team and ran the No. 41 under the Cram Racing Enterprises banner for the rest of the 2020 Truck season.

Ahead of the 2021 Truck season, Cram voiced his plans to run the full schedule. In July, he joined Mike Harmon Racing for his NASCAR Xfinity Series debut at New Hampshire Motor Speedway.

Cram announced that he would attempt the September Darlington race driving the No. 35 for Emerling-Gase Motorsports with Cram Racing Enterprises.

Personal life
Cram's father Kevin Cram is a former crew chief in all three NASCAR national series and his uncle Clinton Cram is still in the profession, crew chiefing Dawson's first Truck attempt.

Motorsports career results

NASCAR
(key) (Bold – Pole position awarded by qualifying time. Italics – Pole position earned by points standings or practice time. * – Most laps led.)

Xfinity Series

Camping World Truck Series

 Season still in progress
 Ineligible for series points

ARCA Menards Series
(key) (Bold – Pole position awarded by qualifying time. Italics – Pole position earned by points standings or practice time. * – Most laps led.)

References

External links
 
 

Living people
2001 births
Racing drivers from San Diego
NASCAR drivers
ARCA Menards Series drivers